Koothadivayal is a village in the Pattukkottai taluk of Thanjavur district, Tamil Nadu, India.

Demographics 

As per the 2001 census, Kotthadivayal had a total population of 301 with 152 males and 149 females. The sex ratio was 980. The literacy rate was 77.27.

References 

 

Villages in Thanjavur district